The Spain national football team has had nine captains since 1980.

References

Captains
Spain
Association football player non-biographical articles